Samuel Abdulai Jabanyite is a Ghanaian politician and member of the Seventh Parliament of the Fourth Republic of Ghana representing the Chereponi Constituency in the Northern Region on the ticket of the National Democratic Congress.

References

Ghanaian MPs 2017–2021
1974 births
Living people
National Democratic Congress (Ghana) politicians